Concord Township is an inactive township in Clinton County, in the U.S. state of Missouri.

The township most likely was named in commemoration of the Battle of Concord.

References

Townships in Missouri
Townships in Clinton County, Missouri